In mathematics, the Freiheitssatz (German: "freedom/independence theorem": Freiheit + Satz) is a result in the presentation theory of groups, stating that certain subgroups of a one-relator group are free groups.

Statement
Consider a group presentation

given by  generators  and a single cyclically reduced relator . In other words, the only relations involving  are the trivial ones.

History
The result was proposed by the German mathematician Max Dehn and proved by his student, Wilhelm Magnus, in his doctoral thesis. Although Dehn expected Magnus to find a topological proof, Magnus instead found a proof based on mathematical induction and amalgamated products of groups.

Significance
The freiheitssatz has become "the cornerstone of one-relator group theory", and motivated the development of the theory of amalgamated products. It also provides an analogue, in non-commutative group theory, of certain results on vector spaces and other commutative groups.

References

Combinatorial group theory